Crawford Notch is a major pass through the White Mountains of New Hampshire, located in Hart's Location. Roughly half of that town is contained in Crawford Notch State Park. North of the high point of the notch, Crawford Brook flows more gently northwest to the Ammonoosuc River, a tributary of the Connecticut River.

The notch is traversed by U.S. Route 302, which closely follows the Saco River southeast to North Conway and less closely follows the Ammonoosuc River northwest to Littleton.

History

Originally called White Mountain Notch, it became known to European settlers when found by Timothy Nash in 1771. The 1772 boundaries of Hart's Grant reflected its shape. It was named for the Crawford family, who were trail-builders and hostelers there in the 19th century. The Tenth New Hampshire Turnpike from Portsmouth was extended through the notch to Lancaster in 1803. The turnpike and later Portland and Ogdensburg Railroad through Crawford Notch opened a new route through the White Mountains for settlers of the area to the northwest to reach Conway on the way to the trading ports on the coast.

A well-documented historic event within the notch was a rockslide that killed the entire Samuel Willey family in August 1826. The family fled their home during the storm to a prepared shelter but were buried by the slide and died in a mass of stone and rubble. Their home was untouched. Mount Willey, on the west side of the notch, is named in their memory. The event in part inspired a short story by Nathaniel Hawthorne titled The Ambitious Guest. Further down the notch, Nancy Brook and Mount Nancy are named for an earlier tragedy.

In the Carroll portion of the notch, the Appalachian Mountain Club has built and operates the Highland Center Lodge and Conference Center (on the site of the Crawford House Hotel, a 19th-century grand hotel which burned in 1972), and has renovated the Queen Anne style Victorian-era Crawford Notch Maine Central train depot as a bookstore. The depot remains a stop on the scenic "Notch Train" of the Conway Scenic Railroad, operated seasonally from North Conway.

Points of interest
Grave of Samuel Bemis, first photographer of the American landscape
Mount Willard, open summit near center of notch with views of the notch's structure

See also

List of mountain passes in New Hampshire
Nash & Sawyer Location, New Hampshire
New Hampshire Historical Marker No. 30: The Crawford Family

Notes

External links
NH State Parks web page
19th century landscape paintings of Crawford Notch
Highland Center Lodge at Crawford Notch

Landforms of Carroll County, New Hampshire
Landforms of Coös County, New Hampshire
Notches of New Hampshire
Appalachian Mountain Club
Carroll, New Hampshire
Hudson River School sites